WBNR is the callsign of an AM radio station licensed to Beacon, New York, and serving the Hudson Valley. The station is owned by Pamal Broadcasting and broadcasts on 1260 kHz at 1,000 watts daytime and 400 watts nighttime, both directional, from a two tower array at 475 South Avenue in the city of Beacon, and its studios are also located in Beacon.  Its programming can also be heard on FM translator W243EM, 96.5 MHz.

History

WBNR signed on in 1959 as a 1,000 watt directional antenna daytime only station built, engineered, owned and operated by Robert Gessner and brothers Sy and Al Dresner  The original studio location is in close proximity to Denning's Point, a location on the Hudson River that has an archaeological record going back 5,000 years.  Many staffers and former staffers felt that this explained a usually high reported incidence of paranormal activity in the studio building.

It was not until 1987 that WBNR was licensed for 480 watts night time operation with a DA2 antenna pattern.   For many years it was owned by brothers Robert and Al Lessnor of Candid Camera fame.  The station served the community with Middle of the Road (MOR) music format,  local news and sports. It was heavily involved with Beacon community events and was the flagship station for Army Football until 2003.

In 1970, Lance (later Beacon) Broadcasting, then owners of WBNR, acquired WSPK from Poughkeepsie, New York based Olympian broadcasting, owners of WKIP, along with the mountain top transmitter site located on North Mount Beacon.

The station began to suffer a long steady decline through the 1980s and 1990s as many AM radio stations did.

In 1994, WBNR, along with its sister station WSPK was sold to Enterprise Media of Binghamton, New York. Both stations were subsequently sold to Pamal Broadcasting in October 1997.  The studios moved from their original 1959 location at 475 South Avenue, Beacon to the newly reconstructed "Broadcast Center" at 715 Fishkill Avenue (NY Rte 52), in Fishkill, New York.

On Monday, March 24, 2014 WBNR and WLNA introduced the "Real Country" music format.

On December 3, 2019, WBNR added translator W243EM (96.5 MHz).

On March 15, 2021, WBNR changed their format from classic country to a simulcast of classic hits-formatted WBPM 92.9 FM Saugerties.

References

External links

Dutchess County, New York
BNR
Radio stations established in 1959
1959 establishments in New York (state)
Pamal Broadcasting
Classic hits radio stations in the United States